Guest for One Night (Italian: L'ospite di una notte) is a 1939 Italian film directed by Giuseppe Guarino and starring Gian Paolo Rosmino, Ugo Sasso, and Guglielmo Barnabò.

It was made at the Titanus Studios in Rome.

Cast
 Gian Paolo Rosmino as L'ispettore Lasalle
 Ugo Sasso as L'ispettore Dunois
 Giovanni Dal Cortivo as Il conte de Meral
 Guglielmo Barnabò as Alberto de Meral
 Vasco Creti as Giacomo
 Renato Chiantoni as Truchet
 Carlo Tamberlani as Jean Berry
 Tosca Sartoris as Germana
 Neda Naldi as Paola
 Gabriella Silvestri as Olga de Meral
 Diego Pozzetto as Mattia
 Amina Pirani Maggi as Caterina
 Pina Gallini as Maria 
 Romolo Bernasconi
 Lina Colombo 
 Cesare Fantoni 
 Aristide Garbini 
 Walter Grant 
 Nora Lenner 
 Vittorio Leoni 
 Orofilo Maldini 
 Elvira Paolini 
 Antonio Ranieri
 Giovanni Ribocchi 
 Dante Rivera 
 Enzo Russo 
 Virgilio Scacchieri 
 Lorenzo Scategni 
 Giovanni Setali
 Elettra Terzolo 
 Germana Vivian

References

Bibliography
 Pasquale Sorrenti. Il cinema e la Puglia. Schena, 1984.

External links

1939 films
1930s Italian-language films
Films directed by Giuseppe Guarino
Italian black-and-white films
1930s Italian films